Rodney Armour Milgate (30 June 1934 – 19 September 2014) was an Australian painter and playwright. He was a Professor of the Visual Arts School of the (then) City Art Institute, University of NSW and newsreader (on the broadcast television Channel 7).

Biography 
Rodney Armour Milgate was born at Kyogle, New South Wales on 30 June 1934.

Milgate was considered one of Australia's most influential artists, especially during the 60s and 70s. His work is represented in major collections around the world and he had many solo exhibitions and awards for his work, including the Blake Prize for Religious Art three times. His play, A Refined Look at existence, first presented in February 1968, was described as "An ironic comedy drama which reworks Euripides' The Bacchae, set in a NSW country town. Daring in form, this was possibly the earliest play to capture the emotional turbulence that characterised the 1960s." In 1960, he married Australian actress Dinah Shearing and the couple had two sons.  Milgate retired to the Central Coast, north of Sydney, where he died on Friday, 19 September 2014.

Selected work

Awards 
 1964 	John Fairfax Human Image Prize 
 1966 	Blake Prize for Religious Art 
 1968 	Harkness Fellowship (Commonwealth Fund, New York), two-year tenure 
 1970 	D' Arcy Morris Memorial Prize 
 1972 	Gold Coast Purchase Prize (jointly) 
 1975 	Blake Prize for Religious Art 
 1977 	Blake Prize for Religious Art (jointly with John Coburn) 
 1978 	Six month Residency, Owen Tooth Memorial Cottage, The Karolyi Foundation, Vence, France 
Six month Residency, Studio Cite Internationale des Arts, Paris, France 
 1986 	Gosford City Art Award – New World 
 1987 	Sydney Morning Herald Heritage Art Award 
 1991 	Mosman Art Award 
 1993 	Outstanding Achievement in Poetry (Editor's Choice), National Library of Poetry, Maryland, USA 
 1993 	CoFA, University of New South Wales, Faculty Research Grant 
 1995 	Positive Images Prize, Pittwater Council, NSW – 'Incident at Avalon Beach', a poem (writing award) 
 1996 	Three months residency, University of NSW Studio, Cite Internationale des Arts, Paris, France

Selected solo exhibitions 
 1962 	Macquarie Galleries, Sydney 
 1963 	South Yarra Galleries, Melbourne 
Macquarie Galleries, Sydney 
 1965 	Macquarie Galleries, Sydney 
	South Yarra Galleries, Melbourne 
	Johnstone Galleries, Brisbane 
	Macquarie Galleries, Canberra 
 1966 	Commonwealth Institute Galleries (by invitation), Whitechapel, London 
	Macquarie Galleries, Sydney 
	Macquarie Galleries, Canberra 
 1967 	Johnstone Galleries, Brisbane 
	Von Bertouch Galleries, Newcastle, NSW 
	Macquarie Galleries, Sydney 
 1969 	Macquarie Galleries, Sydney 
 1970 	Johnstone Galleries, Brisbane 
	Macquarie Galleries, Canberra 
 1971 	Macquarie Galleries, Sydney 
 1972 	Johnstone Galleries, Brisbane 
	South Yarra Galleries, Melbourne 
 1973 	Macquarie Galleries, Sydney 
	Macquarie Galleries, Canberra 
 1974 	Macquarie Galleries, Sydney 
 1976 	Macquarie Galleries, Sydney 
 1977 	Macquarie Galleries, Canberra 
 1980 	Macquarie Galleries, Sydney 
	St James Room, David Jones, Sydney 
	Touring exhibition, Phillip Bacon Galleries, Brisbane, and St Johns Cathedral, Brisbane 
	Solander Gallery, Canberra 
 1982 	Painters Gallery, Sydney 
 1983 	Barry Stern Exhibiting Gallery, Sydney 
 1989 	Bonython-Meadmore Gallery, Sydney 
 1989 	Long Gallery, Wollongong University, NSW (public exhibition of PhD presentation) 
 1991 	David Jones Art Gallery, Sydney 
 1991–92   Fourteen Stations of the Cross  (17 major oil paintings accompanied by poems read and recorded by Dinah Shearing and Ron Haddrick), toured Orange Regional Art Gallery, 
	NSW; Dubbo Regional Art Gallery, 
	NSW; Noosa Art Gallery, Queensland 
	A Search for Meaning – Recent Paintings, Blaxland Galleries, Sydney 
	Poetics in the Paintings of Rod 
	Milgate, Manly Art Gallery Survey Exhibition, Sydney 
 1994 	Points of View, Ivan Dougherty Gallery, College of Fine Arts, University of New South Wales 
 1995 	The Art of Rod Milgate, Manly Art Gallery and Museum 
 1996 	Wagner Galleries, Sydney 
 1998	Artarmon Galleries, Sydney
 2002	Journey into self, Gosford Regional Art Gallery, NSW
 2012	Allograph, Gosford Regional Art Gallery, NSW

Productions and writings 
 1966 	A Refined Look at Existence (three-act stage play), produced at Jane Street Theatre, University of New South Wales, Kensington, Sydney by Robin Lovejoy 
	Art composition: a contemporary view (book) Pub. Angus and Robertson, Sydney
	"The nature of creativity". Commissioned article for October Hemisphere magazine. Pub. Commonwealth Office of education
 1968 	At Least You Get Something Out of That, play commissioned by New South Wales Drama Foundation, produced at Old Tote Theatre Season of Australian plays (including revival of A Refined Look at Existence) 
 1977 	Grass Up to Your Ears and Buckets with Holes in Them (two stage plays) 
 1978	Incident at Novala Beach (novel)
 1979 	A Golden Pathway Through Europe selected for workshop production presentation at the Australian National Playwrights Conference, Australian National University, Canberra 
Triage or the Fortunates (stage play) 'First Hearing', 'Australian Letters', 'Poet's Tongue' and 'Quality Street' broadcast on ABC National Radio 
Pictures at an exhibition (book of poetry) Pub. Elizabethan Press, Sydney
 1980 	A Golden Pathway Through Europe produced at Ensemble Theatre, Milsons Point, Sydney 
Favourites (stage play) 
 1981 	Intruders and Destiny's Mill (two stage plays) 
Grass Up to Your Ears selected for reading at the Australian National Playwrights Conference, Australian National University, Canberra 
 1982 	The Story of Larry Foley (film script) 
 1983 	'Work in Progress', ABC telefilm, The Creative Eye, series on Australian artists 
Destiny's Mill selected for workshop production presentation at National Playwrights' Conference, Australian National University, Canberra 
 1984 	Triage or the Fortunates adapted for radio and accepted for production ABC Radio, Sydney 
Wrote Archibald Prize (stage play) 
 1985 	Anniversary Waltz (stage play) Workshop reading of Intruders at Hunter Valley Theatre Company, Newcastle, NSW 
 1991 	Workshop reading of Anniversary Waltz, Iron €ove Theatre, Sydney 
 1992 	The Search for Meaning – Fourteen Stations of the Cross subject of monograph for ABC National Radio, presented by Caroline Jones, produced by Stephen Godley; poems recorded by Ron Haddrick and Dinah Shearing, Catholic Broadcasting Services, Sydney, * * 1992 
 1993	Incident at Novala Beach Published by College of Fine Arts, NSW University.
The coming of dawn, An anthology Pub. The National Library of Poetry, Owing Mills, Maryland USA
'The Sound of Poetry', cassette recording, one of ten international poems selected and recorded by National Library of Poetry, Owing Mills MD, Maryland, USA 
 1996 	Archibald Prize (stage play), Domain Theatre, Art Gallery of New South Wales; director Aarne Neeme

Acting appearances
The Slaughter of St Teresa's Day (1960) (TV movie)

References

Australian male dramatists and playwrights
1934 births
2014 deaths
Australian television journalists
Academic staff of the University of New South Wales
20th-century Australian painters
20th-century Australian male artists
21st-century Australian painters
21st-century male artists
20th-century Australian dramatists and playwrights
21st-century Australian dramatists and playwrights
Blake Prize for Religious Art winners
Australian male painters